National Entrepreneurship Network or NEN is a community dedicated to fostering entrepreneurship. Services focus on providing institutional capacity building, entrepreneur support, entrepreneurial eco-system and national platforms. Based on an idea by Romesh Wadhwani, and co-founded with Sunita Singh, Nilima Rovshen, and Laura Parkin, the goal of the community is to enable new and future entrepreneurs to access events and resources, share ideas and content, organize and market activities, and forge relationships across India and the world. Programs include a variety of supports including competitions. They are located in Bangalore.

History of NEN
National Entrepreneurship Network (NEN) was launched in 2003, as a non-profit initiative of the Wadhwani Foundation. It was co-founded with IIT Mumbai, IIM Ahmedabad, BITS Pilani, SPJIMR Mumbai and IBAB Bengaluru

See also
 Business incubator
 Business cluster
 Creative entrepreneurship

References

Further reading 
 Robert A. Baron  (2010). Entrepreneurship: An Evidence-based Guide, Edward Elgar Publishing, 229 pages. 
 Kharas, Homi; Makino, Koji; and Woojin Jung (2011). Catalyzing Development: A New Vision for Aid, Brookings Institution Press, 305 pages. 
 Bornstein, David; and Susan Davis  (2010). Social Entrepreneurship: What Everyone Needs to Know, Oxford University Press, 147 pages.

External links
 Official website

Community building
Professional networks
Entrepreneurship organizations
Entrepreneurship in India
2003 establishments in Karnataka
Organisations based in Karnataka
Organizations established in 2003